Scirpophaga ochritinctalis is a moth in the family Crambidae. It was described by George Hampson in 1919. It is found in Angola, the Central African Republic, the Democratic Republic of the Congo (Kasai-Occidental, Bas-Congo), Ghana, Malawi, Nigeria, Sierra Leone, Tanzania, Uganda and Zambia.

The wingspan is 24–31 mm for males and 27–39 mm for females. The forewings of the males are pale ochreous white and the hindwings are white. Females have very pale yellowish-white forewings and white hindwings with an ochreous-yellow anal tuft.

References

Moths described in 1919
Schoenobiinae
Moths of Africa